Brian Avelino Lozano Aparicio (born 23 February 1994) is a Uruguayan professional footballer who plays as a winger for Liga MX club Atlas.

Club career
In July 2016, Lozano joined Nacional on a one-year loan deal from América.

On 13 July 2022, Peñarol announced the signing of Lozano on a one-year loan deal.

In December 2022 Peñarol announced that Santos Laguna, the team owner of Lozano's card, had recalled Brian to send it to Atlas FC on a 3-year long contract.

International career
Lozano is a former Uruguayan youth international. He was part of under-22 team which won gold medal at 2015 Pan American Games.

Personal life
Lozano is the uncle of professional footballer Leandro Lozano.

Career statistics

International

Honours
América
CONCACAF Champions League: 2015–16

Nacional
Uruguayan Primera División: 2016

Santos Laguna
Liga MX: Clausura 2018

Uruguay U22
Pan American Games: 2015

References

External links
 
 Brian Lozano at AUF 

1994 births
Living people
Association football midfielders
Footballers from Montevideo
Uruguayan footballers
Uruguay youth international footballers
Uruguay international footballers
Uruguayan Primera División players
Liga MX players
Defensor Sporting players
Club América footballers
Club Nacional de Football players
Santos Laguna footballers
Uruguayan expatriate footballers
Uruguayan expatriate sportspeople in Mexico
Expatriate footballers in Mexico
Footballers at the 2015 Pan American Games
Pan American Games gold medalists for Uruguay
Pan American Games medalists in football
Medalists at the 2015 Pan American Games